Lāsma Kauniste, née Avotiņa, (born 19 April 1942) is a Latvian speed skater.

Lāsma Avotiņa married Estonian speed skater Toivo Kauniste in 1962 and they settled in Riga. Competing for the Soviet Union as Lāsma Kauniste, she won bronze at the Soviet All-round Championships in 1967 and silver at the World Allround Championships. Although she never won the Soviet Allround Championships, she did become World All-round Champion in 1969. She competed on 1,000 m, 1,500 m and 3,000 m at the 1968 Winter Olympics with the best result of fifth place on 1,500 m.

Kauniste was active in speed skating for a long time, participating in Masters events. She became World Champion Masters in the category over 60 in both 2002 and 2004. At the 2007 World Championships Masters, she won silver in the category over 60.

Her achievements earned her the Honoured Master of Sports of the USSR title.

Medals
An overview of medals won by Kauniste at important championships:

References

External links
 Lāsma Kauniste at SkateResults.com
 Lāsma Kauniste from Deutsche Eisschnelllauf Gemeinschaft e.V. (the German Skating Association)
 Results of Championships of Russia and the USSR from SpeedSkating.ru

1942 births
Living people
Sportspeople from Riga
Olympic speed skaters of the Soviet Union
Speed skaters at the 1968 Winter Olympics
World Allround Speed Skating Championships medalists
Honoured Masters of Sport of the USSR
Recipients of the Order of the Red Banner of Labour
Latvian female speed skaters
Soviet female speed skaters